Tropidelic is an American band from Cleveland, Ohio. They infuse multiple genres into a style that's a blend of reggae rock, hip-hop and high energy funk.

History

Formation (2005–2006)
Tropidelic was formed by founding members Matthew Roads (originally from Pittsburgh) and Kyle "Chevontez" Cheuvront while jamming together in the dorms at Kent State University, located in Kent, Ohio, in 2005. After collaborating with rapper Skillzz (Erick Steckel), the two recruited him as their hype man, as well as adding guitarist Andrew Mastrian to the band. In 2006, they found bassist Neal Badolato and drummer Rob Paternite on MySpace.

With the band now complete, Tropidelic self-produced their first raw album, Funk Love the same year.

Self-produced EPs and lineup changes (2007–2011)
Tropidelic built up a following after they self-distributed over 10,000 free copies of their first self-produced EP, Rebirth of the Dope and relocated to Cleveland.

After the original ensemble (including co-founding member Kyle Cheuvront) went on with their own lifestyles, Roads reformed the band with like-minded professional musicians which included, Chris Dunne on guitar, Corey Harper on bass, Jasen Bakette on drums and DJ Mekadog on the turntables. The band was finding their sound with all different musical styles. Roads describes himself as a "hip-hop guy", guitarist Dunne is mainly an "old-school punk kind of guy", and drummer Bakette is more into alternative rock, so they all make it work into this "reggae-rock style". Bassist Corey Harper, the most recent addition, has only been with the band since May 2010. And "scratcher" DJ Mekadog uses all original records to create his sound; around 7,000 vinyl records in his basement.

With the new members, the band's self-produced second release, and first studio recording, Tree City Exodus was released in 2008. It was titled after the city of Kent's nickname. They followed it up with another EP, Erie Vibes & Irie Tides in winter 2010. Later that year, the band released a six-song EP titled, Working Class Phoenix that Roads described as "symbolic of the rise of our country's lost and disregarded generation."

All Heads Unite (2012)
Over the years, the band has evolved through several member changes (the original and last lineup moved or got married) and Roads added Bobby "Chronic" Markouc as the lead guitarist, David "Pags" Paglisotti on bass, and Derek Willis on drums. The addition of a horn section, Derek McBryde on trumpet, and James Begin on trombone, as well as vocals/raps, who were both super fans of Tropidelic, led up to their first full-length major-released album, All Heads Unite, being released on November 15, 2012. Special guests featured on the album were Echo Movement, Jul Big Green, Shrub and Alex Fagan.

Police State (2015)
Since the release of All Heads Unite, Tropidelic has released six additional albums and EPs. Their follow-up self-produced album Police State, which released on March 21, 2015. It included their first big single "Alcoholic" featuring Brandon Hardesty of Bumpin Uglies and their second single "If I Die Tomorrow" with Zach Fowler of Sun-Dried Vibes.

Go Down With The Ship (2016)
Tropidelic released their third independent album, Go Down With The Ship on April 2, 2016 and featured the songs "Bad Cookie" and "Too Loose".

Later that year on December 2, The Hard North EP was released. It featured two new tracks plus remixes of their previous songs.

Heavy Is The Head (2017)
Their fourth album, Heavy is the Head, was released on November 10, 2017 on Pepper's LAW Records and reached #3 on the Billboard charts on December 2, 2017. The band won Reggae 360's inaugural contest for Album of the Year in 2017 with their Heavy Is The Head album.

Here In The Heights (2019)
Tropidelic's fifth album, Here in the Heights was released on June 7, 2019 through Ineffable Music Group. This full-length album features other notable artists such as Angelo Moore of Fishbone, Howi Spangler of Ballyhoo!, and Zach Deputy, among others. Here in the Heights peaked at #2 on the Billboard reggae charts on June 22, 2019.

The band also finished out 2019 by releasing a five-track EP, Flyover Renaissance, with Ineffable Music Group on December 13, 2019.

Of Illusion (2020)
Tropidelic's sixth studio album, titled Of Illusion was released on November 13, 2020. It features artists Bumpin Uglies, Devin the Dude, Dirty Heads, The Elovaters, Matisyahu, and Shwayze. Of Illusion was Reggae 360's "2020 Album of the Year" winner. The album went up against top contender, Arise Roots' Pathways album in a tournament-style bracket in the final round.

Tropidelic was featured as one of many reggae bands on Collie Buddz riddim album, Cali Roots Riddim 2021 with their single, "Pivot Foot", which was produced by Buddz and mixed by Stick Figure's touring guitarist, producer Johnny Cosmic.

In 2021, Tropidelic was one of several reggae and punk bands on The House That Bradley Built, a charity compilation honoring Sublime's lead singer Bradley Nowell, helping musicians with substance abuse. They covered Sublime's song "Smoke Two Joints" on the Deluxe Edition.

On September 22, 2021, Tropidelic was voted by their hometown, the Winners of Best of Cleveland 2021 for "Best Band".

All The Colors (2022)
Tropidelic recorded their seventh full-length studio album, titled All The Colors which was released on August 5, 2022. It features special musical guests Brother Ali, Geoff Weers of The Expendables, Nick Hexum of 311, Krayzie Bone, Little Stranger, Prof, and Surfer Girl. This is the last album with the band's long-time trumpet player Derek McBryde who announced on Facebook on June 29 that he is moving to Florida with his wife to "help build an alcohol & drug rehabilitation center and run transitional housing". His last local show was at the band's own festival, Everwild and he will be finishing up touring with 311 in September.

All The Colors is also being "considered" for a Grammy Award nomination for "Best Pop Vocal Album" at the 65th Grammy Awards in 2023.

Musical influences
Through the years, Tropidelic formed their sound by fusing together reggae rock, hip-hop, funk and some punk rock. The band's influences range from music artists and bands such as, Sublime, 311, Pepper, Red Hot Chili Peppers, Bad Brains, Mike Patton, Alborosie, Tom Morello, Parliament, Funkadelic, Slightly Stoopid, Outkast, Atmosphere, Pantera, Incubus and Unified Culture.

Tours
Tropidelic has been featured at Electric Forest Festival, California Roots Music & Art Festival, 311 Caribbean Cruise VI, and Warped Tour. Since 2017, Tropidelic has also hosted their own annual grassroots music festival, The Freakstomp Music Festival.

Official festivals

The Freakstomp Music Festival
Tropidelic started hosting a music festival in 2017. The Freakstomp Music Festival is named after their song "Freakstomp" off of their 2015 album Police State and is hosted in annually in August. After hosting the first two events in Medina, Ohio, the event has most recently moved to Clear Fork Adventure Park in Butler, Ohio. The weekend event hosts national and local acts, including artists such as Too Many Zooz, Bumpin Uglies, Mike Pinto, and Afroman.

During the COVID-19 pandemic, the festival was canceled in 2020 and was eventually transformed into the Everwild Festival. It was decided by Tropidelic to embark on a "fresh musical journey" with their fans after stepping into a "New World" after COVID-19.

Everwild Festival
In the summer of 2021, Tropidelic debuted their second official music festival, called "Everwild", a two-night music festival, presented by JSGLive. Held on August 13 and 14, Everwild is a weekend of "music and memories" featuring two nights of Tropidelic at Brushy Fork Phamily Ranch in Newark, Ohio. The lineup includes: Ballyhoo!, Passafire, Kash'd Out, The Palmer Squares, The Ries Brothers, Sun-Dried Vibes, Bikini Trill, and Zoo Trippin', as well as local bands.

Other projects
In December 2019, Tropidelic partnered with Platform Brewing Co. in Cleveland, Ohio to create a winter-inspired cream ale, a 16-ounce can called "Snow Country" after their popular single. It's brewed with flaked corn and a touch of cinnamon, with 4.7% ABV. 

Tropidelic collaborated with Engine Athletics. First in 2020 with a basketball jersey paying homage to two classic Cleveland Cavaliers uniforms. Then with a baseball jersey in 2021 with two color styles to choose from, representing their hometown Cleveland Indians.

Discography

Studio albums

EPs/remixes/live albums

Singles

Lineup
Current members:
 Matthew Roads – Lead Vocals/Guitar (2005–present)
 James Begin – Vocals/Trombone (2012–present)
 Bobby "Chronic" Markouc – Lead Guitar (2012–present)
 David "Pags" Paglisotti – Bass (2012–present)
 Derek McBryde – Trumpet (2012–present)
 Rex Larkman – Drums (2017–present)

Former members:
 Kyle "Chevontez" Cheuvront – Guitar (2005–2008)
 Andrew Mastrian – Guitar (2005-2006)
 Erick "Skillzz" Steckel – Rapper (2005–2006)
 Neal Badolato – Bass (2006–2007)
 Rob Paternite – Drums (2006–2007)
Chris Dunne – Guitar (2007–2011)
Corey Harper – Bass (2007–2011)
Jasen Bakette – Drums (2007–2011)
DJ Mekadog – Turntables (2007–2011)
 Darrick Willis – Drums (2012–2017) 
 Tim Younessi – Saxophone (2016)
 Frank Toncar – Keyboard, Saxophone and Percussion (2017)

References

External links 
 

2008 establishments in Ohio
American reggae musical groups
Musical groups from Kent, Ohio
Musical groups established in 2008